

Administrative and municipal divisions

References

Tyumen Oblast
Tyumen Oblast